Norwegian electronic music duo Röyksopp have released eight studio albums, two mix albums, two extended plays, 34 singles, one promotional single and 18 music videos.

Albums

Studio albums

Mix albums

Extended plays

Singles

Promotional singles

Guest appearances

Remixes

Special releases

Music videos

Notes

References

External links
 
 
 
 

Discographies of Norwegian artists
Electronic music discographies